The men's 20 kilometres walk at the 2008 Summer Olympics took place on 16 August at the Beijing National Stadium.

The qualifying standards were 1:23:00 (A standard) and 1:24:30 (B standard).

Records 
Prior to this competition, the existing world and Olympic records were as follows:

No new world or Olympic records were set for this event.

Results 

PB = Personal Best, SB = Season Best

Intermediates 

s.t. - same time.

References 

Athletics at the 2008 Summer Olympics
Racewalking at the Olympics
Men's events at the 2008 Summer Olympics